Graham Roy Barnett was the Dean of Waikato from 1927 until 1932.

Barnett was born in Nelson, New Zealand on 7 September 1885, educated at Marlborough Boys' College and the University of New Zealand; and ordained in 1912. After Curacies in Ross, New Zealand, Hokitika and St Mary's Church, Portsea he held incumbencies at Tolaga Bay, Te Kuiti, Waihi and Frankton before his time as Dean; and Brighton, Ifield and Thakeham afterwards. Served as Temporary Chaplain to the Forces (TCF) in WW1.

References

1885 births
People from Nelson, New Zealand
People educated at Marlborough Boys' College
University of New Zealand alumni
Deans of Waikato
Date of death unknown